This article shows the rosters of all participating teams at the 2019 FIVB Volleyball Women's Challenger Cup in Peru.

Pool A

The following is the Peruvian roster in the 2019 FIVB Volleyball Women's Challenger Cup.

Head coach: Francisco Manuel Hervas Tirado

The following is the Czech roster in the 2019 FIVB Volleyball Women's Challenger Cup.

Head coach: Ioannis Athanasopoulos

The following is the Croatian roster in the 2019 FIVB Volleyball Women's Challenger Cup.

Head coach: Daniele Santarelli

Pool B

The following is the Argentinian roster in the 2019 Volleyball Women's Challenger Cup.

Head coach: Hernan Ferraro

The following is the Canadian roster in the 2019 FIVB Volleyball Women's Challenger Cup.

Head coach: Thomas Black

The following is the Taipei roster in the 2019 FIVB Volleyball Women's Challenger Cup.

Head coach: Koji Tsuzurabara

References

External links
 Official website

FIVB Volleyball Women's Challenger Cup
FIVB
FIVB
FIVB
International volleyball competitions hosted by Peru
Sports competitions in Lima
2010s in Lima